Exim Bank Team China is a title in auto racing for teams sponsored by Exim Bank of China.  It may refer to:

 Selleslagh Racing Team, who used the title in 2011
 Mühlner Motorsport, who use the title in 2012